Yuluma is a rural community in the central part of the Riverina and a railway station on The Rock - Oaklands Railway line. The station is situated about 616 rail kilometres from Sydney. The railway station was in operation between 1911 and 1975.

References

External links

Towns in the Riverina
Federation Council, New South Wales